The discography of Dappy, a British singer-songwriter, rapper, and actor, consists of two studio album, and four singles. He is best known for being the lead singer of the Camden-based hip hop trio N-Dubz, with his cousin Tulisa and Fazer.

Studio albums

Extended plays

Singles

As lead artist

As featured artist

Promotional singles

Other charted songs

References

Notes

Sources

Discographies of British artists